Robert McNeill (born 21 November 1873) was a Scottish footballer who played for Sunderland as a full back.

Having transferred from Clyde, McNeill made his Sunderland debut against Burnley on 8 September 1894 in a 3–0 win at Newcastle Road. he played for the club between 1894 and 1901 and won an English Football League Championship medal in 1895. He also won the 1895 World Championship. He left Sunderland to sign for Morton in 1901, after making 142 league appearances with no goals.

References

1873 births
Date of birth unknown
Year of death missing
Scottish footballers
Sunderland A.F.C. players
Greenock Morton F.C. players
Clyde F.C. players
Port Glasgow Athletic Juniors F.C. players
Association football fullbacks
Footballers from Glasgow
English Football League players
Scottish Football League players
Scottish Junior Football Association players